Islander is a database of integrative islands in prokaryotic genomes.

See also
 Mobile genetic elements

References

External links
 http://www.indiana.edu/~islander #BrokenLink

Mobile genetic elements
Biological databases